Yi Eon-jeok (25 November 1491 — 23 November 1553), sometimes known by his pen name Hoejae, was a Korean philosopher and politician during the Joseon dynasty. He was a public official and intellectual of the middle era of the Joseon Dynasty of Korea. He was born and died in Gyeongju, then the capital of Gyeongsang province. Like most intellectuals from Gyeongsang in this period, he was a member of the Sarim faction. He contributed to the polarity-nonpolarity (mugeuk-taegeuk) debate in classical Korean Confucianism.

A scion of the Yeoju Yi clan, he passed the literary section of the gwageo in 1514 and entered government service. He was twice expelled from service and then re-hired due to factional strife. He was exiled after Fourth Literati Purge of 1545. He spent the intervening periods teaching on Jaok Mountain in Gyeongju. After his death, the Oksan Seowon was erected on Jaok Mountain to venerate his memory. It still stands today in Angang-eup, Gyeongju City, North Gyeongsang, South Korea.

It was excoriated in Uijeongbu YeonguI Pavilion in 1568 and was established in Jongmyo Shrine in 1569 (King Seonjo 2), and was engaged in Mungmyeong in 1610 (Gwanghagun 2). In addition, the ancestral tablets were enshrined in 17 Seowon schools across the country, including Oksan Seowon in Gyeongju. Yi's main work is titled " Yi Eon-jeong's Old Baseon", and is designated as Treasure No. 586. Other writings are kept at Dok-rak and Oksan Seowon.

Through his adoptive son, Yi eventually became the maternal adoptive great-great-great-great-grandfather of Queen Inhyeon, the second wife of King Sukjong.

Family 
 Great-Grandfather
 Yi Sung-rye (이숭례, 李崇禮)
 Great-Grandmother
 Lady Yang of the Cheongju Yang clan (청주 양씨)
 Grandfather 
 Yi Su-hoe (이수회, 李壽會)
 Grandmother 
 Lady Yi of the Gyeongju Yi clan (경주 이씨); youngest daughter Yi Muk (이묵, 李默)
 Father
 Yi Beon (이번, 李蕃) (1463 - February 1500)
 Uncle - Yi Pil (이필, 李苾)
 Aunt - Lady Jeong of the Ohcheon Jeong clan (오천 정씨); daughter of Jeong Heun (정흔, 鄭昕)
 Cousin - Yi Tong (이통, 李通)
 Cousin-in-law - Lady Yi (이씨)
 First cousin - Yi Eung-in (이응인, 李膺仁); became the adoptive son of Yi Eon-jeok 
 Mother 
 Lady Son of the Gyeongju Son clan (경주 손씨) (? - June 1548)
 Grandfather - Son So (손소, 孫昭) (1433 - 1484)
 Great-Grandfather - Son Sa-seong (손사성, 孫士晟) (1396 - 1477)
 Great-Grandmother - Lady Kwon of the Andong Kwon clan (안동 권씨); daughter of Kwon Myeong-ri (권명리, 權明利)
 Grandmother - Lady Ryu of the Pungdeok Ryu clan (풍덕 류씨, 豊德 柳氏) (? - 4 August 1510)
 Uncle - Son Baek-don (손백돈)
 Aunt - Lady Son of the Gyeongju Son clan (경주 손씨)
 Uncle - Geum Wol-hyeong (금원형, 琴元亨)
 Uncle - Son Jung-don (손중돈, 孫仲敦) (1464 - 1529)
 Cousin - Son Gyeong (손경, 孫曔)
 Uncle - Son Suk-don (손숙돈, 孫叔暾)
 Uncle - Son Gye-don (손계돈, 孫季暾)
 Uncle - Son Yun-don (손윤돈, 孫閏暾)
 Aunt - Lady Son of the Gyeongju Son clan (경주 손씨)
 Uncle - Kang Jung-mok (강중묵, 姜仲默)
 Sibling(s)
 Younger brother - Yi Eon-gwal (이언괄, 李彦适) (10 February 1494 - 14 January 1553)
 Wife
 Lady Park of the Hamyang Park clan (정경부인 함양 박씨); daughter of Park Sung-bu (박숭부, 朴崇阜)
 Issue
 Adoptive son - Yi Eung-in (이응인, 李膺仁); son of Yi Tong (이통, 李應仁) and Lady Yi (이씨)
 Adoptive daughter-in-law - Lady Park of the Hamyang Park clan (함양 박씨); grandniece of Park Sung-bu (박숭부, 朴崇阜)
 Adoptive daughter-in-law - Lady Jang of the Indong Jang clan (인동 장씨); daughter of Jang Eung-gi (장응기)
 Adoptive grandson - Yi Ui-yun (이의윤, 李宜潤) (1564 - 1597)
 Adoptive grandson - Yi Ui-jing (이의징, 李宜澄)
 Adoptive grandson - Yi Ui-hwal (이의활, 李宜活) (1573 - 1627)
 Adoptive great-granddaughter - Lady Yi of the Yeoju Yi clan (여주 이씨)
 Adoptive great-grandson-in-law - Jeong Sim (정심, 鄭杺) (1596 - 1625)
 Adoptive great-great-grandson - Jeong Gyeong-se (정경세, 鄭經世) (1563 - 1633)
 Adoptive great-great-granddaughter - Lady Jeong of the Jinju Jeong clan (증 정경부인 진주 정씨, 贈 貞敬夫人 晉州 鄭氏)
 Adoptive grandson - Yi Ui-jam (이의잠, 李宜潛) (1576 - 1635)
 Adoptive half-grandson - Yi Ui-eun (이의온, 李宜溫)
 Concubine and issue
 Lady Seok of the Yangju Seok clan (양주 석씨); daughter of Seok Gwi-dong (석귀동)
 Son - Yi Jeon-in (이전인, 李全仁)
 Grandson - Yi Jun (이준, 李浚)
 Grandson - Yi Sun (이순, 李淳)

See also 

 Korean philosophy
 History of Korea

References

External links
 Yi Eonjeok on Naver Encyclopedia 
 Yi Eonjeok on Nate 
 을사사화와 회재 이언적 

1491 births
1553 deaths
16th-century Korean philosophers
Korean Confucianists